Utpaladeva (c. 900–950 CE) was an Indian philosopher and theologian from Kashmir. He belonged to the Trika Shaiva tradition and is the most important thinker of the Pratyabhijñā school of monistic idealism. His Īśvarapratyabhijñā-Kārikā (IPK, Verses on the Recognition of the Lord) were the most important and central work of the Pratyabhijñā school. Utpaladeva was a major influence on the great exegete Abhinavagupta, whose works later overshadowed those of Utpaladeva. However, according to the Indologist Raffaele Torella "most of Abhinavagupta’s ideas are just the development of what Utpaladeva had already expounded."

Philosophy 
Torella characterizes Utpaladeva's philosophy as a "unique blend of epistemology, metaphysics, religious experience, linguistic philosophy and aesthetic speculation."

Theology 
For Utpaladeva, the supreme reality, Shiva, is "an absolute I", the atman, a singular subject or consciousness. As Torella notes, Utpaladeva constantly works to prove, contra the Buddhists, that there is "a single, dynamic subject that unifies and animates the discontinuity of reality and constitutes the substratum of every limited subject, as well as of every form and activity of everyday life."

Utpaladeva's view of God is stated in the Īśvarapratyabhijñā-Kārikā:There is only one Great Divinity, and it is the very inner Self of all creatures. It embodies itself as all things, full of unbroken awareness of three kinds: “I”, “this”, and “I am this.”According to Torella, another important and original contribution of Utpaladeva is his doctrine of "abhasas" (light, radiance, manifestations), which sees everything as radiant manifestations of the ultimate consciousness of Shiva which is their necessary foundation. Each "manifestation" is a kind of universal and is connected with a specific Sanskrit word. Torella also notes however that the term abhasa was not a new term "but was commonly used in the Vedantic and Buddhist schools."

Torella explains Utpaladeva's view of God as follows:This I or Consciousness is, on the religious plane, Siva. In his highest form, the supreme divine personality is solely 'I' - consisting of consciousness and beatitude - in whom all the principles are contained though in a state of complete dissolution. He is present throughout the IPK as the ultimate essence of every reality and is also directly men­tioned here and there, even if the stage is generally occupied by a less extreme form of him, which balances between transcendence and immanence. In fact, being an expository work, which requires an object to teach and a recipient of this teaching; it cannot but deal with that form of the God which is open to the world of manifestation, whilst firmly remaining its sovereign. On the supreme plane there is only the I resting in his fullness and no trace of the knowable remains...this more accessible form of the God is connected with the second level. It is mainly indicated as Mahesvara, Isvara, Isa, Prabhu, whereas the supreme form is often given the name of Siva or Paramesvara, but there certainly are exchanges between these two series - which indirectly points out the fact that it is a question of a sole reality and that every distinction of degree and figure is purely instrumental to the expository requirements.This supreme reality expresses itself through a scale of tattvas (reality) in a manner similar to that of Shaivasiddhanta philosophy (all the while remaining thoroughly monistic in character).

Utpaladeva also provided an argument for the existence of God (Ishvara) which was at least partly drawn on Nyaya sources. According to Isabelle Ratie, this argument states that "the universe is an effect consisting of a specific arrangement that must have been created by an intelligent agent considered as its efficient cause." Furthermore, for Utpaladeva, given the complexity and harmony of the universe, this creator must be omniscient and omnipotent.

Recognition 
As Torella notes, the key element in Utpaladeva's theology of liberation is the idea of "recognition" (pratyabhijñā) and how to achieve it. This is none other than the act of recognizing that oneself is the supreme Shiva himself. As Torella explains, recognition is:merely the triggering in the devout of an act of identification, which does not reveal anything new but only rends the veils that hid the I from himself; a cognition is not created but only the blur that prevented its use, its entering into life, is instantly removed. The way by which the master creates the premises for this to occur may, on the contrary, be gradual: this is what Utp. does with his work, which aims through a series of arguments at bringing to light the powers of the I and those of the Lord, until iden­tification is triggered. The practice of such a linear (avakra) path is enough to enter into the nature of Siva and achieve the condition of liberated in life, which may also be accompanied by the extraordinary powers...This occurs within everyday reality just as it is. The light of liberation does not cause its colours to fade, does not cover them but brightens them, performing the miracle of eliminating otherness whilst maintaining the richness of individual flavours.

The influence of Buddhism 
Utpaladeva's philosophy extensively draws on and at the same time criticizes the work of the Buddhist Vijñanavada school of pramana, particularly that of Dharmakīrti. Torella writes that "the criticism of their positions is to Utpaladeva of a substantial help in building and refining the Pratyabhijñā philosophy." While Utpaladeva agrees with the Buddhist critique of the Nyaya categories and uses many of their philosophical tools, he sees their system as lacking an understanding of the supreme lord Śiva, which is "the omnipervasive dynamism of a free and “personal” consciousness."

Torella writes that Utpaladeva's lengthy examination and criticism of the Dignaga-Dharmakirti school of Buddhism "resulted in, or at least was accom­panied by, the peculiar phenomenon of a more or less conscious absorp­tion of their doctrines and their terminology, that was to leave substantial traces in the structure of the Pratyabhijñá." This may have also been a way for Utpaladeva to increase the prestige of his school by adopting some of the ways of a respected opponent. Some of the Buddhist ideas which are borrowed and developed by Utpaladeva are the theories of anupalabdhi and apoha.

The linguistic nature of reality 
Utpaladeva also draws on the linguistic metaphysics of the grammarian Bhartr̥hari, which sees knowledge and reality as pervaded with language. Thus, for Utpaladeva, ultimate reality is a free consciousness that is also linguistic in nature. As Torella writes, Utpaladeva sees an "inevitable presence of language at the heart of every cognitive activity."

As Utpaladeva states in some of the most famous verses of his Īśvarapratyabhijñā-Kārikā:
The essential nature of light is reflective awareness; otherwise light, though ‘coloured’ by objects, would be similar to an insentient reality, such as the crystal and so on. - I.V.11
Consciousness has as its essential nature reflective awareness; it is the supreme Word that arises freely. It is freedom in the absolute sense, the sovereignty of the supreme Self. - I.V.13

Other contributions 
Utpaladeva also had a universalistic view of scripture and religion in general. According to Torella, for Utpaladeva, Āgama (scripture) is ultimately the voice of Shiva, and "it comprises all the existing Āgamas, from the Vaiṣṇava to the Buddhist (the Śaiva included)."

Utpaladeva also wrote on aesthetics. According to Torella, "Precisely to Utpaladeva we do owe the entrance of aesthetics into philosophical–religious speculation. His concept of camatkāra (wondrous enjoyment) marks a higher level of experience, which leaves the reality and beauty of the manifested world intact, but at same time projects it into a totality whose centre is Supreme Consciousness."

References

External links
 Bibliography of Utpaladeva's works, Item 472, Karl Potter, University of Washington
 Shaiva Devotional Songs of Kashmir: A Translation and Study of Utpaladevas Shivastotravali (Suny Series in Human Communication Processes) Constantina R. Bailly

10th-century Indian philosophers
Idealists
Kashmiri people
Kashmiri writers
Kashmir Shaivism
Scholars from Jammu and Kashmir